Caudrot is a commune in the Gironde department in Nouvelle-Aquitaine in southwestern France.

Geography
The Dropt flows into the Garonne in Caudrot. Caudrot station has rail connections to Agen, Langon and Bordeaux.

Population

See also
Communes of the Gironde department

References

Communes of Gironde